Víctor Zaleta Reyes (born May 24, 1984) is a Mexican professional boxer.

Professional career

WBO Super Flyweight Championship
On February 12, 2011, Zaleta lost the fight against Argentina's Omar Andres Narvaez for the WBO Super Flyweight title by unanimous decision.

interim WBA Super Flyweight Championship
On September 29, 2012, Zaleta will fight Liborio Solís for the latter's title in Venezuela.

References

External links

Sportspeople from Ciudad Juárez
Boxers from Chihuahua (state)
Super-flyweight boxers
1987 births
Living people
Mexican male boxers